The British Academy consists of world-leading scholars and researchers in the humanities and social sciences. Each year, it elects fellows to its membership. The following were elected in the 1930s.

1930
 Professor Norman H. Baynes
 Dr J. Bonar
 Professor J. Wight Duff
 Dr Edward Jenks
 H. W. B. Joseph
 Professor J. E. Lloyd
 Dr Allen Mawer
 Professor J. G. Robertson
 Rev. H. E. Salter
 Professor C. K. Webster

1931
 Professor W. M. Calder
 Sir William A. Craigie
 W. E. Crum
 Professor H. W. Garrod, CBE
 Professor S. H. Langdon
 Dr R. R. Marett
 Professor J. H. Muirhead
 Professor E. J. Rapson
 G. J. Turner
 Beatrice Webb
 Professor A. N. Whitehead
 Professor J. Dover Wilson

1932
 H. I. Bell, OBE
 Sir T. L. Heath, KCB, KCVO
 Dr R. B. McKerrow
 Dr W. Miller
 Professor H. A. Prichard
 D. H. Robertson
 Professor R. W. Seton-Watson
 Professor D. Nichol Smith
 Very Rev. H. J. White

1933
C. Bailey
 Professor S. A. Cook
 Professor R. M. Dawkins
 Dr J. K. Fotheringham
 Professor J. Laird
 Professor R. W. Lee
 Professor G. C. Moore Smith
 Professor J. Holland Rose
 Sir Herbert Thompson

1934
 Dr A. E. Brooke
 R. G. Collingwood
R. E. W. Flower
C. Johnson
 Professor J. S. Mackenzie
N. McLean
 Dr A. W. Pickard-Cambridge
 Professor H. J. Rose
 Professor R. H. Tawney
 R. Campbell Thompson
 Professor P. H. Winfield

1935
A. W. Clapham
R. G. Hawtrey
 Professor A. Berriedale Keith
 Dr F. R. Tennant
 Professor Basil Williams

1936
 Professor F. E. Adcock
E. A. Barber
 Dr L. D. Barnett
 Dr A. J. Carlyle
 Professor G. N. Clark
 Sir John Marshal
 Dr H. Thomas

1937
 Lascelles Abercrombie
 Sir W. Beveridge
W. H. Buckler
 F. M. Cornford
 J. D. Denniston
 Sir H. Richmond
 Professor Arnold Toynbee

1938
 Professor B. Ashmole
 Lord Atkin
 Dr C. M. Bowra
 E. W. Brooks
 Professor W. G. de Burgh
 Dr D. Randall-MacIver
 Rev. Dr J. W. Oman
 Dr C. T. Onions
 Professor Ifor Williams

1939
 Professor J. M. Creed
 Campbell Dodgson
 Professor G. R. Driver
 Professor V. H. Galbraith
 Sir Stephen Gaselee
 Dr A. D. McNair
 Sir Sarvepalli Radhakrishnan

See also 
 Fellows of the British Academy

References 
The above names are taken from (and reported as in) the British Academy Annual Reports, found in the Proceedings of the British Academy for the years 1933 to 1939. The names for the years 1930–32 are from Proceedings of the British Academy, vol. xviii (1932), pp. vii–x.